Charlotte Ray is a beauty queen from Camden, New Jersey who competed in the Miss USA and Miss World pageants.

Miss USA
Ray won the title of Miss New Jersey USA 1991 in August 1990, the first time she entered the pageant.   She went on to represent New Jersey in the 1991 Miss USA pageant, which was televised live from Wichita, Kansas on February 22, 1991.  Ray made the top ten in seventh place after the preliminary competition, and  won the interview portion of the semifinal competition and came fourth in swimsuit.  After the evening gown, swimsuit and interview competitions, Ray's average score placed her third overall. She improved after the final question, placing first runner-up to Kelli McCarty of Kansas.

Miss World
Later that year, as first runner-up to Miss USA 1991, Ray gained the right to represent the United States at Miss World 1991 held in Atlanta, Georgia.  She was a top 10 semifinalist in that pageant, which was won by Ninibeth Leal of Venezuela.

References

External links
Miss New Jersey official website

Living people
1960s births
People from Camden, New Jersey
Miss World 1991 delegates
Miss USA 1991 delegates
20th-century American people